John Gamble was an American record producer and audio engineer, and a member of record production and songwriting team Stimulated Dummies with Geeby Dajani and Dante Ross.

He worked on production, mixing and programming on songs for the likes of 3rd Bass, Brand Nubian, KMD, Leaders of the New School, Grand Puba, Del the Funky Homosapien, Kurious, AZ, Everlast, Santana, Run-DMC, The Getaway People, Korn and Macy Gray.

Mr. Gamble earned platinum discs for his production and engineering work on 8 Mile: Music from and Inspired by the Motion Picture , Everlast's Whitey Ford Sings the Blues and Supernatural (Santana album). In addition he won a Grammy Award for Album of the Year at 42nd Annual Grammy Awards for Supernatural.

He died unexpectedly in his sleep on October 16, 2020 in his New York City apartment at Westbeth Artists Community.

Awards and nominations 

!
|-
|align=center|1999
|Supernatural
|Grammy Award for Album of the Year
|
|
|-

References

External links 

American audio engineers
American record producers
American hip hop record producers
Grammy Award winners
Living people
1960 births